Pethia sharmai is a species of ray-finned fish in the genus Pethia. It is found in Tamil Nadu, India.

References

Pethia
Barbs (fish)
Fish described in 1993